Lachlan Murphy (born 4 December 1998) is a professional Australian rules footballer playing for the Adelaide Football Club in the Australian Football League (AFL). He was drafted by Adelaide with their third selection and thirty-eighth overall in the 2018 rookie draft.

Murphy grew up in the Melbourne suburb of Diamond Creek. He started at Auskick level  with Diamond Creek Junior Football Club and attended primary school at Sacred Heart in Diamond Creek, Victoria. He went to high school at Ivanhoe Grammar School. He grew up as a Collingwood Football Club supporter.

Lachlan was the inaugural winner of the Brent Harvey medal for best and fairest for the Northern Knights TAC cup team in 2016.

References

External links

1998 births
Living people
Adelaide Football Club players
Adelaide Football Club (SANFL) players
Northern Knights players
Australian rules footballers from Melbourne
People educated at Ivanhoe Grammar School
People from Diamond Creek, Victoria